

This is a list of the 375 heavy rail passenger stations in and around London, England (339 being within the boundary of Greater London) that are accessible using Transport for London tickets and passes. United Kingdom railway stations are grouped into one of a number of categories, ranging from A—national hub to F—small unstaffed bare platform. Many of the principal central London stations are managed by Network Rail and together form a London station group. Most other stations are managed by the train operating company that provides the majority of services at the station. The London Underground is the manager of some stations that are also served by heavy rail services.

Scope 
The list includes National Rail stations. It does not include stations exclusively served by the London Underground, Tramlink and Docklands Light Railway. The list includes all railway stations in Greater London and those outside the boundary that are included in:
London fare zones 1–9, or
fare zones C, G and W for Oyster card pay-as-you-go, or
the area of the Freedom Pass scheme (excluding the lines where the pass is only valid on TfL services); which covers parts of the counties of Buckinghamshire, Essex, Hertfordshire, Kent and Surrey.

List of stations

Busiest stations by yearly passenger traffic

See also 

List of closed railway stations in London
List of London Underground stations

Footnotes 
 members of the London station group
 outside the Greater London boundary
 an earlier station has existed at the location
 domestic and international platforms categorised A; Thameslink platforms categorised C
 Govia Thameslink Railway platforms categorised C; London Overground platforms categorised E

References 
Notes

Bibliography

 Borley, H.V.  (1982) Chronology of London Railways. Railway and Canal Historical Society. Oakham, Leicester 
 White, H.P. (1963) A Regional History of the Railways of Great Britain: Volume III: Greater London, Phoenix House, London
 Course, E. (1962) "London Railways" Batsford Ltd. London

External links 
National Rail – London Connections
Transport for London – London Connections

 
London
London railway stations
Railway stations London